Dionysius the Areopagite (Dionysios ho Areopagitēs) was an Athenian judge at the Areopagus Court in Athens, who lived in the first century. A convert to Christianity, he is venerated as a saint by multiple denominations.

Life

As related in the Acts of the Apostles, he was converted to Christianity by the preaching of Paul the Apostle<ref>[https://www.britannica.com/biography/Dionysius-the-Areopagite Britannica, The Editors of Encyclopaedia. "Dionysius The Areopagite". Encyclopedia Britannica']</ref> 

After his conversion, Dionysius became the first Bishop of Athens, though he is sometimes counted as the second after Hierotheus. He is venerated as a saint in the Catholic and the Eastern Orthodox churches. He is the patron saint of Athens and is venerated as the protector of the Judges and the Judiciary. His memory is celebrated on October 3.

Historic confusions
In the early sixth century the so-called Corpus Dionysiacum'', a series of writings of a mystical nature, employing Neoplatonic language to elucidate Christian theological and mystical ideas, was ascribed to the Areopagite.

Dionysius has been misidentified with the martyr Dionysius, the first Bishop of Paris. However, this mistake by a ninth century writer is ignored and each saint is commemorated on his respective day.

Modern references
In Athens there are two large churches bearing his name, one in Kolonaki on Skoufa Street, while the other is the Catholic Metropolis of Athens, on Panepistimiou Street. The pedestrian walkway around the Acropolis, which passes through the rock of the Areios Pagos, also bears his name.

Dionysius is the patron saint of the Gargaliani of Messenia, as well as in the village of Dionysi in the south of the prefecture of Heraklion. The village was named after him and is the only village of Crete with a church in honor of Saint Dionysios Areopagitis.

See also 
 St. Dionysus Institute in Paris
 Early centers of Christianity#Greece
Cathedral Basilica of St. Dionysius the Areopagite (A Roman Catholic church in Athens named after Dionysius the Aeropagite)

Further reading

References

Sources

External links

Hieromartyr Dionysius the Areopagite the Bishop of Athens Orthodox icon and synaxarion
 Max Müller Dionysius the Areopagite Lecture 1895

Ancient Athenians
Doctors of the Church
1st-century Christian saints
1st-century bishops in Roman Achaea
1st-century Christian theologians
People in Acts of the Apostles
1st-century Christian martyrs
Converts to Christianity from pagan religions
Saints of Roman Athens
Bishops of Athens
Clergy from Athens